Geodia exigua is a species of sponge that produces the sesquiterpene spiro compound exiguamide. The species was first described by Johannes Thiele in 1898. It is a marine organism known from Japan.

References

Tetractinellida
Animals described in 1898
Fauna of the Pacific Ocean